The Soviet War Memorial in Schönholzer Heide (Sowjetisches Ehrenmal in der Schönholzer Heide) in Pankow, Berlin was erected in the period between May 1947 and November 1949 and covers an area of 30 000 m². The memorial contains the largest Soviet cemetery in Berlin, which is also the largest Russian cemetery in Europe outside of Russia.

The monument is one of three Soviet memorials built in Berlin after the end of the war. The other two memorials are the Tiergarten memorial, built in 1945 in the Tiergarten district of what later became West Berlin, and the Soviet War Memorial (Treptower Park).

Schönholzer Heide was a popular recreation area in the 19th century. During the Second World War the area was turned into a work camp. After the war, the north-western part of the area was used to build the third largest Soviet war memorial in Berlin, together with the memorials in Treptower Park and Tiergarten.

A group of Soviet architects consisting of K. Solovyov, M. Belaventsev, V. Korolyov and the sculptor Ivan Pershudchev made the plan for the cemetery, where 13,200 of the 80,000 Soviet soldiers that had fallen during the Battle of Berlin, would be buried. On a wall around the memorial there are 100 bronze tablets where the names, ranks and birth dates of the soldiers it was possible to identify are written. This group constitutes about one-fifth of the fallen soldiers.

On both sides of the main axis, which at its one end sits a 33.5 meter tall obelisk made of syenite, there are placed 8 burial chambers where 1182 soldiers are buried. Under the Honor Hall inside the obelisk there are buried two Soviet colonels.

A statue of the personification of Mother Russia is situated in front of the obelisk and constitutes the main focal point of the memorial. On the statue's base, which is made out of black porphyry, sit 42 bronze tablets on which the names of fallen officers are inscribed.

Gallery

See also 
 Soviet War Memorial (Vienna)

External links

 Ehrenmal Schönholzer Heide auf den Seiten der Berliner Senatsverwaltung für Stadtentwicklung
 Iwan Gawrilowitsch Perschudtschew (German transcription)

Monuments and memorials in Berlin
Soviet military memorials and cemeteries in Germany